Ushakovo is a rural locality (a village) in Gorodetskoye Rural Settlement, Kichmengsko-Gorodetsky District, Vologda Oblast, Russia. The population was 142 as of 2002. There are 3 streets.

Geography 
Ushakovo is located 3 km southwest of Kichmengsky Gorodok (the district's administrative centre) by road. Kichmengsky Gorodok is the nearest rural locality.

References 

Rural localities in Kichmengsko-Gorodetsky District